My Pet Monster is a character that began as a plush doll first produced by American Greetings in 1986. It has horns, blue fur, a fanged smile, and wears breakaway orange plastic handcuffs.

The property was sold to Saban Brands in 2012.  Then in 2018, Hasbro acquired the My Pet Monster brand from Saban Brands.

Plush 
The My Pet Monster character began as a plush doll first produced by AM Toys, a subsidiary of American Greetings, in 1986. As one of the few plush dolls marketed to boys at the time, My Pet Monster was popular in the late 1980s and early 1990s. The doll has blue fur, horns and a fanged smile, and is recognizable by its orange plastic handcuffs. The handcuffs could also be worn by children and came with a breakaway link so that the child could simulate breaking the chain. Several versions of the doll have been released in various sizes and other attributes. Other characters were also created with brightly colored fur and unorthodox names like Gwonk, Wogster and Rark. Their popularity allowed a wealth of merchandise including coloring books, Golden Look-Look books, frame-tray puzzles and various other items.

Toymax released a 22-inch tall talking My Pet Monster doll in 2001.

Media

The character's popularity spawned a live-action direct-to-video film in 1986 about a boy named Max who becomes the Pet Monster after being exposed to a statue, changing when hungry. Dr. Snyder, the scientist who originally discovered the statues and the legend behind them, wants to kidnap him for publicity purposes, while Max's sister helps him out of the crisis. A pilot for an unproduced series, it ends on a cliffhanger as Snyder is exposed to a statue of a much larger and more menacing monster and begins to transform.

My Pet Monster also spawned a children's cartoon series that ran for one season on ABC, produced by Ellipse (France), Nelvana (Canada), and Hi-Tops Video in association with Golden Books. It gives a completely different origin for the creature than the live-action film. The show follows Monster, who lives with a boy named Max. When Monster wears his handcuffs, they turn him into a stuffed animal. Max often puts the handcuffs on Monster to keep his existence secret from others. Max's sister, Jill, and his friend Chuckie, are the only ones that know this secret.

The two main adversaries in the show are Mr. Hinkle, a neighbor who always thinks Max is up to something, but is not quite sure what; and Beastur, a large monster who hates light and tries to bring Monster back to MonsterLand. Beastur, though immense and fierce, is incompetent. He can be stopped by the magic cuffs -— which reduce him to a smaller, though still "alive" monster -— or by his own bungling, and sent back through the warp portal to his own world. He wears dark glasses to protect his sensitive eyes, which he can use to see in the dark.

Beastur appears in nearly every episode as either a primary or secondary foe. On one occasion, he is scared back through the portal to Monsterland not by light or the cuffs, but by the affections of a smitten female gorilla. In the final episode, it is also shown that Beastur hates to be hugged, even more so than being exposed to light.

Though not a breakthrough success, the cartoon show significantly boosted sales of the already popular plush toy. Much of the voice cast of My Pet Monster reunited in 1989 for Beetlejuice, another cartoon show with a surreal theme and a supernatural world populated by fantastic monsters.

Reruns of all 13 half-hour episodes aired on Teletoon Retro in Canada from September 5, 2011.

Characters
"Monster" (voiced by Jeff McGibbon in TV series, portrayed by Mark Parr in special) - The Monster, Max's friend in series, as opposed to being Max in special)
Max Smith (portrayed by Sunny Besen Thrasher) - Becomes a monster in the special, but is a separate character in TV series. When he wins the surfing competition he is referred to as Max Smith.
Chuckie (voiced by Stuart Stone) - Max's best friend in TV series, does not appear in the special.
Jill Smith (voiced by Alyson Court) - Max's older sister in the TV series. Monster clearly has a crush on her.
Melanie (portrayed by Alyson Court) - Max's sister in special.
Beastur (voiced by Dan Hennessey, briefly voiced by Jack Darley in commercial) - A giant monster in the series who pursues Monster with the intention of taking him back to Monsterland. Briefly mentioned at the end of the special as the name of one of the monsters represented by the statues.
Mr. Hinkle (voiced by Colin Fox) - Suspicious neighbor who is aware of Monster's antics, but never actually succeeds in proving Monster exists.
Princess (voiced by Tracey Moore) - Hinkle's dog which resembles a Standard Poodle.
Dr. Snyder (portrayed by Colin Fox) - Mad scientist and later monster hunter in special.
Rod (portrayed by Yannick Bisson) - Max's older brother in special, aware of Max's monster changing ability.
Stephanie (portrayed by Kelly Rowan) - Rod's date in special.
Hinkle's niece, Jenny
Wolfmen (musicians)
Leo (school bully)
Annie (voiced by Tara Charendoff) - Neighbour/Jill's friend.
Jumbo Jim (ringer)
Mrs. Smith (portrayed by Jayne Eastwood) - Max and Jill's mother, brief role at the beginning of the special where it is revealed her first name is Julie.
Rex Stalker (monster hunter)
Blaine (portrayed by Hadley Kay) - Max's nemesis in Boogie Board Blues.

Episodes

Direct-to-video special (1986)

Series (1987)

Home media
On October 28, 2008, KaBoom! Entertainment released My Pet Monster- The Complete Series, featuring all 13 episodes, on DVD exclusively in Canada.
On October 6, 2009, Trinity Home Entertainment released My Pet Monster- The Complete Series on DVD in the USA.
The live-action film was originally released on VHS. It has yet to be released on DVD, Laserdisc, Video CD, or Blu-ray.

References

External links
My Pet Monster at Don Markstein's Toonopedia. Archived from the original on March 19, 2016.

1980s American animated television series
1980s Canadian animated television series
1980s toys
1987 American television series debuts
1987 American television series endings
1987 Canadian television series debuts
1987 Canadian television series endings
American Broadcasting Company original programming
American children's animated fantasy television series
Canadian children's animated fantasy television series
Fictional humanoids
Fictional monsters
Stuffed toys
Television series by Nelvana
Animated television series about monsters